The Ermita de la Virgen del Val is a hermitage located in Montejo de Tiermes, Spain south of the province of Soria. It was declared Bien de Interés Cultural in 2000.

Architecture
The chapel consists of a nave with a rectangular apse and south portico, formed by four wooden pillars resting on rough stone bases.

References 

Bien de Interés Cultural landmarks in the Province of Soria
Christian hermitages in Spain